Aidan McArdle (born 1970) is an Irish actor.

Early life
McArdle was born in Dublin.  He studied for an Arts degree at University College Dublin before going on to study at the Royal Academy of Dramatic Art in London, England.

Career

First roles in theatre
His work with the Royal Shakespeare Company includes the title role in Richard III and the role of Puck in A Midsummer Night's Dream. He also appeared in the title role of a stage adaptation of John Irving's A Prayer for Owen Meany by Simon Bent at London's Royal National Theatre in 2002, along with the role of Joseph Surface in Deborah Warner's 2011 The School for Scandal at the Barbican Centre.

First roles in film
He appeared in the BBC Two show Beautiful People in 2008. His first foray into the Hollywood film industry was as Slannen, an elf who secretly aspires to be a lawyer in the 2004 movie Ella Enchanted. He appeared as a supporting character, Jewish anarchist Saul Landau, on an episode of the 2009 BBC TV series, Casualty 1909.

Television
As of 2005 his most significant roles have been in television biographical films. These roles include Dudley Moore in the 2004 television movie Not Only But Always, Albert Einstein in the 2005 biography E=mc², and Igor Stravinsky in the 2005 production Riot at the Rite.

McArdle is well known for his numerous television roles, the majority of which are period roles. He has recently starred in Garrow's Law as John Silvester and in the comedy television series Beautiful People as Andy Doonan. He also worked on the British period drama Mr Selfridge about the founder of the department store Selfridges as Lord Loxley who becomes an arch-enemy to Harry Selfridge. A further prominent role was as a defence lawyer in The Fall. Since 2022, he has appeared in the ITV series Ridley.

Personal life
He was married to actress Aislín McGuckin. They divorced in 2019. He is a cousin of Steve Coogan.

Filmography

References

External links
 

1970 births
Alumni of RADA
Alumni of University College Dublin
Irish male film actors
Irish male radio actors
Irish male stage actors
Irish male television actors
Living people
People from County Dublin
Royal Shakespeare Company members
Irish male Shakespearean actors